The 1950 Lower Hutt mayoral election was part of the New Zealand local elections held that same year. The elections were held for the role of Mayor of Lower Hutt plus other local government positions including twelve city councillors, also elected triennially. The polling was conducted using the standard first-past-the-post electoral method.

Background
The incumbent Mayor, William Gregory, sought re-election for a full term after winning a by-election the previous year. Gregory was opposed by Labour Party candidate Percy Dowse who had been a councillor since 1947 (and previously from 1935 to 1938). Dowse, who had run for mayor unsuccessfully twice before in 1938 and 1944, defeated Gregory. Labour won in a landslide securing not only the mayoralty but all 12 seats on the city council as well. However, one of the successful candidates was Dowse resulting in the twelfth council seat being allocated to Citizens' candidate Norman Player.

Mayoral results

Councillor results

 
 
 
 
 
 
 
 
 
 
 
 
 
 
 
 
 
 
 
 
 
 
 
 
 
 

Table footnotes:

Notes

References

Mayoral elections in Lower Hutt
1950 elections in New Zealand
Politics of the Wellington Region